Nad lipom 35 is a Croatian comedy television show, that is airing on Nova TV (Croatia).  The author of the show is Stevo Cvikić. The series started broadcasting in 2006.

It has featured stars such as Lana Jurčević and Novi fosili performing at the fictional sports bar.

Background
In the 1990s, Croatian Radiotelevision aired the comedy series Jel' me netko tražio? (lit. "Did anyone ask for me?".) The plot consisted of a few guests and employees of a bar discussing various topics. Nad lipom 35 is a successor to that series, which adds tenants above the bar. The phrase "Did anyone ask for me?" is still used. Many of the actors remained in the new version, including Ivica Zadro, Nives Ivanković, Slavko Pintarić and Branimir Vidić.

Cast
Ivica Zadro as Šef (bartender) (2006–present)
Damir Mihanović a novel / Neven (2006–present)
Nives Ivanković as a waitress Mickey (2006–present)
Elizabeta Kukić as Bosiljka Picek / Doctor (2006–present)
Mirna Maras as a journalist, Nina (2006–present)
Jadranka Matković as Rebecca Rosewood (2006–present)
Slavko Pintarić Runway as Štefek (2006–present)
Žarko Potočnjak as Srecko Les (2006–present)
Branimir Vidić as Zvonimir Valley (2006–present)
Tomislav Štriga as a police officer (2006–present)
Hrvoje Grčević as punk (2006–present)
Emilio Bunjac as May (2007–present)
Mario Valentić as Luigi Kenjalo (2008–present)

References

Croatian television series